Heidi Mittermaier (born 28 January 1941) is a German alpine skier. She competed in two events at the 1964 Winter Olympics.

References

1941 births
Living people
German female alpine skiers
Olympic alpine skiers of the United Team of Germany
Alpine skiers at the 1964 Winter Olympics
Skiers from Munich